is a Mongolian professional sumo wrestler from Ulaanbaatar. He began his professional sumo career in 2013 at the age of eighteen. His highest rank to date has been maegashira 9. He wrestles for the Oitekaze stable.

Early life and education
Shijirbayar spent his childhood in Ulaanbaatar and was a good student, but was sent to Japan to study after his fourth grade year, with his mother wishing for him to get a better education. While at this new school he discovered sumo and started wrestling. After showing an aptitude for sumo, by junior high school he was asked by fellow Mongolian rikishi Sensho to join Shikihide stable but chose to stay in school. In high school he was introduced to Oitekaze Oyakata who then took him into Oitekaze stable. His shikona of Daishōhō was derived from his stablemaster, with the hō kanji coming from yokozuna Taihō and Hakuhō.

Career
Shijirbayar entered sumo in the January 2013 tournament. He started strong with a 6-1 in jonokuchi and winning the jonidan division the following tournament with a perfect 7-0 record. He made steady progress until he reached the makushita remaining there for 16 basho before gaining sekitori status by being promoted to the jūryō division after the September 2016 tournament. He told reporters when his promotion was announced that he looked up to yokozuna Kakuryū as a role model, and that he simply hoped to get a kachi-koshi or winning record in his jūryō debut. However, in the event Daishōhō fell short of that with a 5-10 record in November 2016, and he was immediately demoted back to makushita.  After a year in makushita, he earned promotion back to jūryō for the January 2018 tournament. He was able to remain in the division this time, recording six straight winning records to rise to Jūryō 1 by January 2019. He secured another 8–7 record in January, and won  promotion to the top makuuchi division for the first time at the rank of maegashira 16. He became the 25th Mongolian to be promoted to makuuchi, and alongside Tomokaze and Terutsuyoshi it marked the first time since May 2013 that three wrestlers had made their top division debuts simultaneously.

In the March 2019 tournament in Osaka Daishoho fell just short of a winning record with seven wins against eight losses. However he remained in the top division at the same rank when the banzuke was released for the May 2019 tournament. In this tournament he secured his first winning record in the top division of 9–6, and was promoted to his highest rank to date of maegashira 9 for the July 2019 tournament. He lost to Enhō on the final day to fall to a 6–9 record in July, and a disappointing 5–10 score in September saw him fall to maegashira 15 for the November tournament.

Daishōhō lost his top division status after the November 2019 tournament. After the September 2020 tournament he was demoted from jūryō to makushita. After three tournaments in makushita he returned to the jūryō division after the March 2021 tournament. He returned to the top division in March 2023.

Fighting style
Daishōhō is a yotsu-sumo wrestler, preferring grappling techniques to pushing and thrusting. His most common winning kimarite is a straightforward yori kiri, or force out, and he uses a migi-yotsu grip on the mawashi or belt, with his right hand inside and left hand outside his opponent's arms.

Career record

See also
List of active sumo wrestlers
List of non-Japanese sumo wrestlers
Glossary of sumo terms

References

External links
 

1994 births
Living people
Mongolian sumo wrestlers